Koen van der Biezen (born 10 July 1985) is a Dutch professional footballer who plays as a forward.

Career
Van der Biezen was born in Nuland.

In July 2011, he joined Polish club Cracovia on a three-year contract.

On 31 July 2012, he moved to German 3. Liga side Karlsruher SC on a two-year contract.

References

External links
 
 
 

Living people
1985 births
People from Maasdonk
Sportspeople from Oss
Association football forwards
Dutch footballers
FC Den Bosch players
Go Ahead Eagles players
MKS Cracovia (football) players
Karlsruher SC players
Arminia Bielefeld players
SC Paderborn 07 players
TOP Oss players
SV TEC players
2. Bundesliga players
3. Liga players
Eerste Divisie players
Tweede Divisie players
Ekstraklasa players
Dutch expatriate footballers
Expatriate footballers in Poland
Expatriate footballers in Germany
Dutch expatriate sportspeople in Poland
Dutch expatriate sportspeople in Germany
Footballers from North Brabant
21st-century Dutch people